María Nela Prada Tejada (born 24 January 1980) is a Bolivian diplomat and politician serving as the minister of the presidency since 2020. A member of the Movement for Socialism, she served as chief of staff under Luis Arce during his tenure as minister of economy from 2006 to 2017 and in 2019.

Biography 
María Nela Prada was born on 24 January 1981 in Santa Cruz de la Sierra to Ramón Prada and Betty Tejada. Her father served as prefect of Santa Cruz from 1999 to 2001, appointed by President Hugo Banzer. Prada's mother, Betty Tejada, served as president of the Chamber of Deputies from 2013 to 2014. Due to familial links, the family was historically related to Banzer's right-wing Nationalist Democratic Action party —Ramón was the nephew of Banzer's wife, Yolanda Prada. However, by 2005, Prada and her mother had aligned themselves with the Movement for Socialism (MAS-IPSP) —which came to power the following year— as a result of the social movements spearheaded by the MAS at the time. Prada recalls that, though she and her father "did not share the same political path […] he taught me to respect those differences".

Prada graduated from university with a degree in international relations and went on to receive a master's degree in State planning and economics. Additionally, she is fluent in three languages. Prada's economics experience led her to accompany Luis Arce as his chief of staff during his decade-long tenure as minister of economy in the government of Evo Morales. Additionally, in 2011, she served as director of the Bolivian Port Services Administration (ASPB).

Minister of the Presidency 
Upon becoming president, Arce appointed Prada as his minister of the presidency on 9 November 2020. She is the first woman to have held the position. After being sworn in, Prada delivered a speech on behalf of the new ministerial cabinet, in which she advocated for reconciliation and stated that "differences must be accepted" between supporters and opponents of Arce's government. In 2022, she was designated as the head of the Rape and Femicide Case Review Commission, formed by the president to investigate cases of corruption by judges in favor of convicts charged with femicide or rape.

References 

1981 births
Living people
21st-century Bolivian politicians
21st-century Bolivian women politicians
Bolivian diplomats
Bolivian women diplomats
Luis Arce administration cabinet members
Movement for Socialism (Bolivia) politicians
People from Santa Cruz de la Sierra
Presidency ministers of Bolivia
Women government ministers of Bolivia